The Hekou Yao Autonomous County is an autonomous county in the southern part of the Yunnan province of China. It is part of the Honghe Hani and Yi Autonomous Prefecture and borders the northern Vietnamese city of Lào Cai. It was apparently known as Zhongcheng during the Tang dynasty.

Administrative divisions
At present, Hekou Yao Autonomous County has 2 towns, 3 townships and 1 ethnic township. 
2 towns
 Hekou
 Nanxi

3 townships
 Laofanzhai
 Yaoshan
 Lianhuatan

1 ethnic township
 Qiaotou Miao and Zhuang

Ethnic groups
The Hekou County Gazetteer (1994) lists the following ethnic groups.
Yao
Hongtou Yao 红头谣 (autonyms: Mian 棉, Meng 孟, Dongban Heiyou 洞斑黑尤, meaning "Yao person")
Landian Yao 兰綻瑶 (autonyms: Xiu 秀, Xiumen 秀门, Men 门, Houmen 喉闷)
White Yao 白线瑶 (autonyms: Heiyou Meng 黑尤蒙, Gengmen 耿闷, Jingdi Men 敬底闷, meaning Mountain Top Yao person 山上瑶人
Sha Yao 沙瑶 (autonyms: Heiyou Meng 黑尤蒙, Gengwan Men 耿晚闷, meaning Mountain Bottom Yao person 山底瑶人
Zhuang
Miao
Yi
Dai
Buyi
Han

Climate

Industrial Park
Hekou Border Economic Cooperation Zone
First established in 1992, Hekou Border Economic Cooperation Zone is a border zone approved by State Council in China to promote trade between China and Vietnam. It has a planned area of 4.02 square kilometers. The zone implemented several policies to serve its clients in China from various industries and sectors including investment, trade, finance, taxation, immigration, etc.

Transport

There are bus route to all destinations within Yunnan, including an overnight sleeper service from Kunming. More destinations can be reached by transfer in Mengzi.

Highway
There is a highway linking Xinjie, a town in Hekou County, with Lào Cai Province in northern Vietnam. It opened in February 2008 and marked the completion of the first highway linking Yunnan with a neighboring country from the Association of Southeast Asian Nations (ASEAN).

The 56.3 kilometer, 3.58 billion yuan Xinhe highway is one of the numerous infrastructure projects that will increase connectivity between Yunnan and ASEAN and facilitate the transport of people and goods between the two regions, which are expecting to see a major increase in tourism and trade in the coming years.

Railway
The narrow-gauge Yunnan–Vietnam Railway, connecting Kunming with the port of Haiphong, opened by the French in 1910, crosses the China-Vietnam border in Hekou.

In December 2014, the last section (Mengzi–Hekou) of the new standard-gauge Kunming-Hekou Railway was completed. It ends at the new Hekou North Railway Station, which is also connected by narrow-gauge tracks to the old railway, in order to facilitate cargo movement between China and Vietnam.

References

External links

Hekou County Official Website
GMS Cross-Border Transport Agreement - Asian Development Bank

 
China–Vietnam border crossings
County-level divisions of Honghe Prefecture
Yao autonomous counties